Shifu, You'll Do Anything for a Laugh is a 2001 collection of novellas by Nobel prize-winning author Mo Yan.

References 

2001 Chinese novels
Novels by Mo Yan
Chinese novellas
Arcade Publishing books